Fijnaart en Heijningen is a former municipality in the Dutch province of North Brabant. It covered the villages of Fijnaart and Heijningen.

Fijnaart en Heijningen was a separate municipality until 1997, when it was merged with Zevenbergen.

References

Municipalities of the Netherlands disestablished in 1997
Former municipalities of North Brabant
Moerdijk